Bliss is a city in Gooding County, Idaho, United States. The population was 318 at the 2010 census. It has frequently been noted on lists of unusual place names.  It has been documented in a photography book published in 2022 as a "disappearing" town.

Geography
Bliss is located at  (42.926123, -114.948697).

Climate
According to the Köppen Climate Classification system, Bliss has a semi-arid climate, abbreviated "BSk" on climate maps.

Demographics

As of 2000 the median income for a household in the city was $25,313, and the median income for a family was $32,500. Males had a median income of $29,821 versus $14,375 for females. The per capita income for the city was $10,731.  About 11.5% of families and 12.2% of the population were below the poverty line, including 13.6% of those under the age of eighteen and 4.2% of those 65 or over.

2010 census
As of the census of 2010, there were 318 people, 117 households, and 72 families residing in the city. The racial makeup of the city was 72.3% White, 0.3% Native American, 2.2% Asian, 23.6% from other races, and 1.6% from two or more races. Hispanic or Latino of any race were 34.6% of the population.

There were 117 households, of which 38.5% had children under the age of 18 living with them, 45.3% were married couples living together, 12.8% had a female householder with no husband present, 3.4% had a male householder with no wife present, and 38.5% were non-families. 33.3% of all households were made up of individuals, and 5.1% had someone living alone who was 65 years of age or older. The average household size was 2.72 and the average family size was 3.65.

The median age in the city was 34.8 years. 28.9% of residents were under the age of 18; 10.1% were between the ages of 18 and 24; 23.7% were from 25 to 44; 29.2% were from 45 to 64; and 8.2% were 65 years of age or older. The gender makeup of the city was 50.9% male and 49.1% female.

See also
 List of cities in Idaho

References

External links

Cities in Idaho
Cities in Gooding County, Idaho